Rollinia amazonica is a species of plant in the Annonaceae family. It is endemic to Colombia.

References

amazonica
Endemic flora of Colombia
Flora of the Amazon
Vulnerable flora of South America
Taxonomy articles created by Polbot
Taxobox binomials not recognized by IUCN